Sandalia meyeriana is a species of sea snail, a marine gastropod mollusk in the family Ovulidae, the ovulids, cowry allies or false cowries.

Description
The length of the shell attains 14.2 mm.

Distribution
This marine species occurs off Japan.

References

 Cate C.N. (1978). New species of Ovulidae and reinstatement of Margovula pyrulina (A. Adams, 1854). The Nautilus 92(4): 160-167
  Lorenz F. & Fehse D. (2009) The living Ovulidae. A manual of the families of allied cowries: Ovulidae, Pediculariidae and Eocypraeidae. Hackenheim: Conchbooks

External links
 Cate C.N. (1973). A systematic revision of the recent cypraeid family Ovulidae. The Veliger. 15 (supplement): 1-117
 Cate C.N. (1978). Recently discovered new species of Ovulidae chiefly from Wakayama Prefecture, Japan (Mollusca: Gastropoda). Venus. 37(4): 191-204

Ovulidae
Gastropods described in 1973